Hajr District is a district of the Hadhramaut Governorate, Yemen. As of 2003, the district had a population of 25,566 inhabitants.

Climate

References

Districts of Hadhramaut Governorate